Riticocha (possibly from Quechua rit'i snow, qucha lake) is a mountain in the Vilcanota mountain range in the Andes of Peru, about  high. It is located in the Puno Region, Carabaya Province, Ollachea District. Riticocha lies north-east of the mountains Ananta and Macho Ritti and the lakes Mancacocha and Jomercocha.

References

Mountains of Peru
Mountains of Puno Region